Pyo Hyeon-gi (born 14 March 1933) is a South Korean boxer. He competed in the men's flyweight event at the 1956 Summer Olympics. At the 1956 Summer Olympics, he lost to René Libeer of France.

References

1933 births
Living people
South Korean male boxers
Olympic boxers of South Korea
Boxers at the 1956 Summer Olympics
Place of birth missing (living people)
Flyweight boxers